Construction barrels (officially known as "drums" in the United States) are traffic control devices used to channel motor vehicle traffic through construction sites or to warn motorists of construction activity near the roadway. They are used primarily in the United States, but are occasionally used in Canada, Mexico and Costa Rica. They are an alternative to traffic cones which are smaller and easily hit by vehicles. Drums tend to command more respect from drivers than cones as they are larger, more visible, and give the appearance of being formidable obstacles.

Construction barrels are typically bright orange and have four alternating white and orange reflective bands. However some regions, such as the province of Ontario, Canada, use black barrels with orange stripes. Most have a rubber base that prevents the barrel from tipping over during high winds. Construction barrels have a handle at the top so they can be easily picked up and carried. The handle also allows crews to install barricade lights to increase visibility. The product makes up a $90 million industry in the United States.

Until the late 1980s, construction crews typically used 55-gallon steel drums to guide traffic through construction areas. They were painted orange and white and filled with sand or water to keep them in place. Because the drums were steel and weighed down with sand or water, extensive damage would occur to vehicles striking them. Plastic barrels that are commonly seen on American roadways today began emerging in the late 1970s and 1980s; steel 55-gallon drums were largely phased out by the 1990s and may no longer be used as traffic control devices in the US.  

By 1981, the drums were mainly a two-piece plastic design that included the top piece of the drum and a base that was filled with sandbags. The same year, an updated version of the invention was released by PSS; it included a flange to allow sandbag placement on the outside of the drum which made it easier to maneuver. In 1985, PSS released the modern-day version of the construction barrel, the LifeGard® drum. The LifeGard® utilized the sidewall of a recycled truck tire at its base to keep the drum securely in place on the roadway. This design is the most common one in use today.

See also
 Bollard
 Road traffic control
 Traffic cone

References

External links
 Stabilized barrel-like traffic control element by Jack H. Kulp et al., a 1993 improved version of the traffic barrel, on Google Patents
 

Road construction
Road safety
Road traffic management
Safety equipment
Streetworks
Traffic signs